Russ Parker (born 3 August 1952) is an Australian cricketer. He played in nine first-class matches for South Australia between 1974 and 1979.

See also
 List of South Australian representative cricketers

References

External links
 

1952 births
Living people
Australian cricketers
South Australia cricketers